Don Gregorio may refer to:

Don Gregorio, Dominican Republic, town in the Dominican Republic 
[[Don Gregorio (opera)|Don Gregorio (opera)]], by Donizetti, a revised version of L'ajo nell'imbarazzo''

Nickname
Gregorio Pérez, Uruguayan football player and manager
Gregorio Pérez Companc, richest person in Argentina